Valor (Valor Music Group) was a Christian gospel group made up of John Laws, Paul David Kennamer, Benjamin Dixon. and Kelly Mowrer. The group has been compared to groups such as Take 6, Acappella, and the Gaither Vocal Band. The group is based near Huntsville, Alabama. Valor features Paul David Kennamer's four-octave range. John Laws' name appears on more than five million records for his work as producer, chief engineer, arranger, studio vocalist, and songwriter. Before Valor, John spent 11 years with the music ministry of Acappella and Vocal Union as a recording and sound engineer.

Through the years, they have gone through several star-studded personnel changes. Tenor and lead spots have been filled by such vocal powerhouses George Pendergrass, Jon McLemore, Reggie Smith, Steve Reischl, Joey Mustain, Chad Bahr, Daniel Johnson and others.

Discography

References
Valor Music Group, accessed April 19, 2020 at https://www.discogs.com/label/1709495-Valor-Music-Group

External links
Official Website
Chapel Contemporary

American Christian musical groups